Turbo acutangulus is a species of sea snail, a marine gastropod mollusk in the family Turbinidae, the turban snails.

Description
The shell is turreted with one acute transverse keel in the middle of each whorl. The colour pattern is pale horn or greyish and somewhat transparent. It has about 15 transversely striated whorls with a sharp keel in the middle and a smaller one at the base of each.

Distribution
This marine species occurs in the Gulf of Bengal.

References

acutangulus
Gastropods described in 1758
Taxa named by Carl Linnaeus